Robert Charles "Chuck" Brannan III is a Republican member of the Florida Legislature representing the state's 10th House district, which includes Baker, Columbia, Hamilton, and Suwannee counties and part of Alachua County.

History
A seventh-generation Floridian, Brannan worked in law enforcement for 29 years, including stints as a deputy U.S. Marshal and the chief investigator for the Baker County Sheriff's Office.

Florida House of Representatives
Running to succeed term-limited Rep. Elizabeth Porter, Brannan won the August 28, 2018 Republican primary, defeating Marc Vann. In the November 6, 2018 general election, Brannan easily defeated Democrat Ronald W. Williams II and two candidates with no party affiliation.

References

Brannan, Chuck
21st-century American politicians
Living people
University of Florida alumni
1962 births